Eric Jean-Louis (born 1957) is a Haitian painter. Born in Jérémie, Jean-Louis has received several awards in Haiti for his paintings. His works have been exhibited in the United States, Guadeloupe, Denmark, Curaçao, Switzerland, and France beginning in 1977.

References
 
 

1957 births
20th-century Haitian painters
20th-century male artists
Haitian male painters
Living people
21st-century painters
People from Grand'Anse (department)